Donelan is the surname of the following people:
Donelan (cartoonist) (Gerard Donelan, born 1949), American cartoonist
Anthony Donelan (1846–1934), Irish soldier and politician
Bradleigh Donelan (born 1968), English cricketer 
Christopher Donelan (born 1964), American law enforcement officer and politician 
Joseph F. Donelan Jr. (1918–1999), United States Assistant Secretary of State
Michelle Donelan (born 1984), British politician

English-language surnames